David Hoyt may refer to:

 David Hoyt (conductor), Canadian horn player and conductor
 David L. Hoyt (born 1965), American puzzle and game inventor
 David B. Hoyt, executive director of the American College of Surgeons